The AD60 class were Beyer-Garratt patent articulated four-cylinder, simple, non-condensing, coal-fired superheated, 4-8-4+4-8-4 heavy goods steam locomotives built by Beyer, Peacock and Company for the New South Wales Government Railways in Australia.

Design

The AD60 Class 4-8-4+4-8-4 Beyer-Garratt patent consists of a boiler carried on a separate frame in the centre of the locomotive and supported by the frames of the two engines, one at each end. The locomotive thus consists of three parts: a front engine unit carrying a water tank, an intermediate chassis pivoted to each engine unit supporting a boiler and cab, and a rear engine unit carrying a coal bunker and water tank.

The design incorporated the most modern technology to minimise maintenance and repairs, including:
integral cast steel engine bed frames incorporating the cylinders
large steel boiler with roundtop firebox and flexible stays
mechanical stoker
roller bearings fitted to bogie, coupled wheels and crankpins
valve gear operated by Hadfield powered reversing gear

Introduction
This was the only type of Garratt locomotive to operate on the New South Wales Government Railways. Designed to a light axle load of only , they were intended for hauling feeder branch-line services to the main lines where heavier main-line locomotives could continue with the load.

In 1949, twenty-five were initially ordered from Beyer, Peacock and Company, followed by a further twenty-five. Following a change of policy in favour of diesel traction, negotiations were entered into, in order to cancel the last part of the order. Forty-two complete locomotives were delivered, together with spare parts equating to approximately five further locomotives. The five sets of parts did not include engine unit frames. The cancellation contract stipulated that the NSWGR could not assemble the spare parts into complete locomotives without paying substantial royalties to Beyer-Peacock. The last three locomotives were cancelled completely and the assembly positions at the Gorton Works of Beyer-Peacock were sold to the South African Railways.

The locomotives were delivered in their five major component pieces: Front engine, rear engine, boiler-cab, rear bunker and front water tank. These five sub assemblies were built into a complete locomotive in NSW.

Locomotive 6002 was the first to enter service in July 1952 with the last, 6040 delivered on 2 January 1957. The locomotives were the most powerful to operate in Australia but behind the D57 in terms of tractive effort.

Improvements
Early trials established that the  bunker was insufficient to allow the locomotives to operate from Enfield to Goulburn resulting in the bunkers being enlarged to carry . Ventilation of the cabs caused considerable concern. Consequently, the class was banned from working through single-line tunnels, this ban also being in response to the difficulty crews would have climbing out in the event of failure within such tunnels. Amongst attempts to improve cab ventilation, 6011 was experimentally fitted in September 1952 with a large tube along the front bunker and boiler to funnel air from the front of the locomotive into the cab. It was unsuccessful and was removed in 1955. Some improvement was obtained by running the locomotives bunker first.

Owing to the length and noise of the locomotive, crews found difficulty in hearing warning detonators. To rectify the situation, tubes were fitted to convey the sound from the leading wheels to the cab. This mechanism can still be seen today on 6040 at the NSW Rail Museum.

When it became apparent that the Garratts would see more service on main lines than on the lighter branch lines, it was decided to increase the tractive effort of a number of the class by enlarging the cylinder diameter and by altering the weight distribution by removing liners from the bogies. To distinguish these improvements the double plus sign ++ was painted after the number and they were nicknamed Super Garratts. These 30 were also fitted with dual controls for bunker first running and denoted DC. To accommodate them,  turntables were installed at Broadmeadow, Enfield and Werris Creek depots.

Operation
The class initially entered service on the Main North and Main South and later Main Western line as far as Dubbo and Parkes. Because of their light axle load they were cleared to operate on the Crookwell, Captains Flat, Temora, Narrandera and Bourke lines.

Typical workings in the mid-1960s would consist of bulk export coal and general goods movements :

Demise & preservation
6012 was the first of the class to be withdrawn in 1955. The next few to be withdrawn suffered accident damage in major collisions in 1961 (6003 Geurie) and 1963 (6028 Glenlee - rebuilt and returned to service by 1965).  Dieselisation accounted for the gradual withdrawal of the other 39 of the class from 1965.  The last withdrawn was 6042 which operated the final New South Wales Government Railways steam service on 22 February 1973.  Shortly after, it was chosen to work the ceremonial "Last Steam Train" from Newcastle to Broadmeadow on 2 March 1973, where it was ceremonially driven through a celebratory banner by the-then NSW Transport Minister, the Honourable Milton Morris.

References

Further reading

External links

Beyer, Peacock locomotives
Garratt locomotives
Railway locomotives introduced in 1952
60
4-8-4+4-8-4 locomotives
Standard gauge locomotives of Australia